Ebihara (written: 海老原 or 蛯原) is a Japanese surname. Notable people with the surname include:

, Japanese boxer
, Japanese golfer
, Japanese diplomat
, Japanese ballet dancer
, Japanese television announcer
, Japanese javelin thrower
, Japanese model and actress

Japanese-language surnames